The 2002 Cronulla-Sutherland Sharks season was the 36th in the club's history. They competed in the National Rugby League's 2002 Premiership.

Season summary
In the off-season the Sharks signed former Melbourne Storm premiership-winning coach Chris Anderson, who also brought along with him the halfback involved in that premiership, Brett Kimmorley.

After a poor start to the season by the Sharks' standards, the Sharks set about with a record-equalling 11-game winning streak which did not crossover with the Bulldogs' famous 17-match run. The highlight of Cronulla's season was a huge 64–14 win over an injury-hit Newcastle Knights at home in round 22, exacting revenge after a 52–6 loss at Newcastle in round six (one of Cronulla's worst ever defeats). Eventually the Sharks finished 5th at the end of the premiership season and were drawn an away final against the Sydney Roosters at Aussie Stadium. Despite scoring five tries apiece, it was the goalkicking that proved the difference as the Roosters emerged victors 30-20 (Brett Kimmorley missed all five of his conversion attempts). The Sharks advanced further due to favourable results, which ultimately saw them pitted against rivals St. George Illawarra in the second round of the finals. The Sharks were seeking revenge after the Dragons denied them a place in the 1999 decider (which would have had them pitted against Anderson and Kimmorley's Melbourne Storm) and indeed the Sharks won 40–24. For the second year in succession, and the third in four years, the Sharks reached the penultimate weekend of the season, only to lose against the minor premiers New Zealand, ending another season in agony.

Ladder

References

Cronulla-Sutherland Sharks seasons
Cronulla-Sutherland Sharks season